Tabulaephorus thomasi is a moth of the family Pterophoridae. It is found in Afghanistan.

References

Moths described in 1993
Pterophorini
Insects of Afghanistan